Dewald Meyer Senekal, born in Uitenhage, South Africa, is a South African rugby union coach who is currently Forwards coach of Irish province Connacht.

In his playing career, Senekal played as a number eight for Bayonne, Agen and Toulon in France. He also played for the Cheetahs and Lions in his native South Africa before moving to the Northern hemisphere in 2009.

Senekal has also played cricket for the provincial teams of Eastern Province and the Northerns.

References

External links
 

1981 births
Living people
People from Uitenhage
South African rugby union players
RC Toulonnais players
SU Agen Lot-et-Garonne players
Aviron Bayonnais players
Rugby union number eights
Cheetahs (rugby union) players
Golden Lions players
Lions (United Rugby Championship) players
Pumas (Currie Cup) players
Eastern Province cricketers
Northerns cricketers
Rugby union players from the Eastern Cape